Xylota jakutorum is a Palearctic species of hoverfly.

Description
External images
For terms see Morphology of Diptera Antero-dorsal hairs on the hind femora all shorter than half of the maximum depth of femur, longer hairs confined to the basal 1/5 of
the femur length; posterior anepisternum dusted. Bartsch et al. figure the genitalia of jakutorum and the closely similar Xylota caeruleiventris  Van Veen provides an identification key.

Distribution
Fennoscandia South to the Pyrenees and Italy, Ireland East through Central Europe to European Russia and on to Siberia.

References

Diptera of Europe
Eristalinae
Insects described in 1980